Baldric or Balderic (Bald[e]ricus) was the Duke of Friuli (dux Foroiuliensis) from 819, when he replaced Cadolah according to Thegan of Trier in his Vita Hludowici imperatoris, until 828, when he was removed from office: the last Duke of Friuli.

Baldric was an imperial legate in 815, when he crossed into Zealand with an army of Saxons and Abotrites to restore the deposed King of Denmark, Harald Klak.

As ruler of Friuli, Baldric continued Cadolah's war against Ljudevit Posavski (Liudovitus), the Pannonian Croat leader. He was successful in expelling Ljudevit from imperial territory. He and Count Gerold also made war on the Bulgars at the order of Bertric, the count of the palace, in 826.

With George, presbyter of Venice, he escorted a hydraulic organ to Aachen in 826.

In 828, Baldric was removed from Friuli for his failure to have mounted an effective defense against the Bulgars during their invasion of 827, and the dukedom was divided into four counties. Eventually the counties would be united under a marchio (margrave), but the duchy would never be restored.

Sources
Thegan of Trier. Vita Hludowici Imperatoris.
Einhard. Life of Charlemagne.
Annales Fuldenses translated by Timothy Reuter, with commentary (subscription needed).
Annales Regni Francorum - 

Dukes of Friuli
Nobility of the Carolingian Empire
8th-century births
9th-century deaths